In topology, a dispersion point or explosion point is a point in a topological space the removal of which leaves the space highly disconnected.

More specifically, if X is a connected topological space containing the point p and at least two other points, p is a dispersion point for X if and only if  is totally disconnected (every subspace is disconnected, or, equivalently, every connected component is a single point). A space can have at most one dispersion point or explosion point. Every totally separated space is totally disconnected, so every explosion point is a dispersion point.

The Knaster–Kuratowski fan has a dispersion point; any space with the particular point topology has an explosion point.

If p is an explosion point for a space X, then the totally separated space  is said to be pulverized.

References
. (Note that this source uses hereditarily disconnected and totally disconnected for the concepts referred to here respectively as totally disconnected and totally separated.)

Topology